Townfield, or Robert Gilchrist House, is a historic home located at Port Royal, Caroline County, Virginia. The original section was built between 1740 and 1747, and is a -story, central passage plan frame dwelling in the Georgian style.  It has a gable roof and dining room and a projecting pavilion addition built in 1823.  Attached to the original house is a two-story, gable-roofed, Federal hall-and-parlor-plan addition, constructed in 1857 at a right angle to the dining room.  This forms the stem of the overall "L" plan. Also on the property is a contributing family cemetery.

It was listed on the National Register of Historic Places in 1994.  It is located in the Port Royal Historic District

References

Houses on the National Register of Historic Places in Virginia
Federal architecture in Virginia
Georgian architecture in Virginia
Houses completed in 1747
Houses in Caroline County, Virginia
National Register of Historic Places in Caroline County, Virginia
Individually listed contributing properties to historic districts on the National Register in Virginia